Bonita is an open-source business process management and low-code development platform created in 2001. Bonita technology was developed originally in 2001 by Miguel Valdés Faura, at the French Institute for Research in Computer Science and Automation, and subsequently transferred to Groupe Bull. In 2009, the Director of the BPM division, Miguel Valdes Faura, founded Bonitasoft, which is a French open-source software vendor.

The company 

Bonitasoft is a French open-source software vendor, founded in 2009 by Miguel Valdes Faura (currently CEO) and Charles Souillard (currently COO). Its flagship process automation platform for applications and BPM projects is Bonita, which has been extended with two integratable technology modules (Bonita Continuous Delivery for DevOps, and Bonita Intelligent Continuous Improvement for process prediction using AI) and is now also available as a Bonita Cloud edition, launched in 2019.

Bonitasoft originally raised more than 28 million euros dedicated to the creation of its business (in 2009 4.5 million euros from Ventech and Auriga, in 2011, 8 million from Serena Capital and in 2013, 10 million from its investment funds and BPI, then 5 million in 2014 from the same investors). In 2018 Bonitasoft had an overall new business growth of 45%, and a customer renewal rate of 93%. The company has been profitable since 2017.

Features 
The Bonita application platform has several major components:
Bonita Studio It allows the user to graphically modify business processes using parts of the BPMN standard. The user can also connect processes to other pieces of the information system (such as messaging, enterprise resource planning, enterprise content management, and databases) in order to generate an autonomous business application accessible via web portals, web forms, and mobile devices. Bonita Studio also allows the user to start with processes designed with other standards and technologies such as XPDL or jBPM. It is based on Eclipse.
Bonita BPM Engine The BPM process engine is a Java application that executes process definitions created with Bonita Studio. REST and Bonita Engine APIs allow the user to interact programmatically with other processes, platforms, and information systems. It is available under LGPL. 
Bonita Portal This is an out-of-the-box portal that allows end-users to manage the tasks in which they are involved. The Bonita portal also allows the owner of a process to administer and to get reports about processes. It is based on AngularJS.
Bonita UI Designer Provides out-of-the-box features, based on AngularJS and Bootstrap, and extension points that allow user interface developers to mix graphical tools, tooling and frameworks, and custom coding to develop customized user interfaces.
Bonita Continuous Delivery An add–on based on Docker and Ansible that permits automatic provisioning with Amazon AWS cloud technology.

Bonita BPM is open-source and can be downloaded under GPL.

Releases 
 2001: First version of Bonita, at INRIA
 2008: Bonita 4, at Groupe Bull
 June 2009: Creation of Bonitasoft, the company supporting Bonita BPM
 September 2009: Bonitasoft raises 3 million dollars
 January 2010: Release of Bonita Open Solution, 5th version of Bonita.
 June 2010: Release of Bonita Open Solution 5.2
 October 2010: Release of 5.2.4 (installer size, 219 MB; installed folder size, 331 MB)
 November 2010: Launched Bonita Open Solution 5.3
 22–23 December 2010: Bonita Open Solution 5.3.2 is released. Bonitasoft reaches 100 paying customers of its software BOS
 January 27, 2011: Bonita Open Solution 5.4 was released., which offers key feature upgrades to achieve greater usability. Bonita Open Solution was downloaded more than half million times.
 May 27, 2011: Bonita Open Solution 5.5 was released, which builds critical new features into Bonitasoft's core offering that make developing, testing and managing BPM applications faster and easier.
 September 13, 2011: Bonitasoft closes $11 million Series B funding to fuel continued worldwide growth and momentum.
 October 19, 2011: Bonitasoft BPM surpasses one million downloads and 250 paying customers.
 October 27, 2011: Bonita Open Solution 5.6 released, adding new offers to maximize productivity, accelerate business process-driven application delivery, and secure mission critical deployments.

September 28, 2012: 5.7.3
October 11, 2012: 5.8
November 20, 2012: 5.9
January 8, 2013: 5.9.1
March 15, 2013: 5.10 – Supports clustering on the Bonitasoft Subscription Packs (SP) but not clustering on the Bonitasoft Open Source (BOS).
June 5, 2013: Bonita BPM 6.0 was released, with a complete rewrite of the Engine and the Portal.
July 8, 2014: Bonitasoft introduces BonitaCloud
December 16, 2014: Bonita BPM 6.4.0 
June 18, 2015: Bonita BPM 7.0.0 
August 6, 2015: Bonita BPM 7.0.2
September 16, 2015: Bonita BPM 7.1
Feb 9, 2016: Bonita BPM 7.2
July 19, 2016: Bonita BPM 7.3
January 5, 2017: Bonita BPM 7.4
May 30, 2017: Bonita BPM 7.5
December 8, 2017: Bonita 7.6 
June 7, 2018: Bonita 7.7
December 6, 2018: Bonita 7.8
July 1, 2019: Bonita 7.9
July 1, 2019: Bonita Cloud version
February 6, 2020: Bonita 7.10
June 25, 2020: Bonita 7.11
January 28, 2021: Bonita 2021.1 
September 23, 2021: Bonita 2021.2
March 30, 2022: Bonita 2022.1

See also 
 Business process modeling
 Business Process Model and Notation
 Comparison of Business Process Modeling Notation tools
 Digital transformation
List of free and open-source software packages
 Low-code development platforms

References 

(en) ZDNET (2021) - The year ahead in DevOps and agile: Time to instill a sense of urgency

(en) CIOdive (2020) - Bonita Cloud’s Digital Automation Enables Prompt Action as Fall Flu Vaccine Demand Rises

(en) KM World (2020) - From back-end developers to mission-critical workplace automation: The low-code advantage

(en) Dev. to (2020) - How to test a Bonita UI Designer page using Cypress

(en) Dev.to (2020) - 3 simple ways to create connectors for the Bonita Platform

(en) Medium (2020) - Using process discovery on business process management (BPM) through BPMN

(en) Dev.to (2020) - 12 simple steps to build a neumorphic login page with Bonita UI Designer

(en) Medium (2020) - Building Maintenable Software

(en) CRN (2020) - CRN 2020 Partner Program Guide

(en) Forbes Technology Council (2020) - Orchestration Of Systems And People: The Human Element Of Automation

(en) Aragon Research (2020) - Aragon Reveals the Aragon Research Globe™ for Digital Business Platforms

(en) Solution Review (2020) - Solutions Review Releases New 2020 Buyer’s Guide for Business Process Management

(en) Solutions Review (2019) - The 24 Best Process Management Tools for 2019 and Beyond

(en) Forbes Tech Council (2019) - Connecting with Technology Mentors: 10 Effective Methods for Young Professionals

(en) Forbes Tech Council (2019) - Six Ways To Get Your Employees On Board With Cybersecurity

(en) Network Computing (2019) - RPA: “Resuscitation of Process Automation?”

(en) Integration Developer News (2019) - Bonita Cloud Offers Fast, Fail-Safe Way To Bring Process Apps, Automation to the Cloud
Workflow applications
Java enterprise platform
Java (programming language) libraries
Free software programmed in Java (programming language)
Information technology management